The 1989–90 Edmonton Oilers season was the Oilers' 11th season in the NHL, and they were coming off their shortest playoff run in seven years when the Los Angeles Kings defeated Edmonton in the first round of the playoffs.  Edmonton improved their point total from 84 to 90, and finished in 2nd place in the Smythe Division.

Regular season

In the first month of the season, the Oilers faced adversity on multiple fronts, on and off the ice. First, goaltender Grant Fuhr underwent an emergency appendectomy in training camp that would keep him sidelined for several weeks. Backup goaltender Bill Ranford would start the season in his place. Next, forward Jimmy Carson, the team's leading goal scorer from the previous year, abruptly left the team after the 4th game of the season and demanded a trade. Among his reasons, Carson found the pressure of replacing Wayne Gretzky, the player he was traded for, impossible to play under. In addition, Carson, who grew up in Michigan with an affluent family, did not enjoy life in the city of Edmonton, which was nearing the end of a crushing recession. Finally, the Oilers granted Carson's wish and dealt him to his hometown Detroit Red Wings. In return, The Oilers received forwards Petr Klima, Joe Murphy, and Adam Graves, and defenceman Jeff Sharples from Detroit. Finally, in the Oilers' fifth game of the season, at home against the Los Angeles Kings, Wayne Gretzky broke the all time NHL points record held by Gordie Howe; watching Gretzky celebrate the milestone was tough on his former Oilers' teammates, who felt they should have been the ones celebrating with him. These incidents, combined with weak defensive play and penalty killing, combined to put the Oilers on a slide early in the season, and they reached the quarter-mark of the season with a 6-9-5 record, which sat them in last place in the Smythe Division. To make matters worse, Fuhr, who returned from his appendectomy, injured his shoulder and was sidelined again. The one bright spot on the team was forward Mark Messier, who sat 2nd in the NHL in points at the 20 game mark and would battle all season with Gretzky, Mario Lemieux and Steve Yzerman for the Art Ross Trophy.

Then, buoyed by the formation of the line of Martin Gelinas, Graves, and Murphy, the Oilers embarked on a run where they lost only once in 13 games. While many of their offensive stars were not scoring as they did in previous seasons, the Oilers succeeded by playing an all-around game, and overtook the slumping Calgary Flames for first place in the division. The Oilers' record over their next twenty games was 15-3-2, and they finished the halfway point of the season with a record of 21-12-7, good for second place in the entire NHL behind the Buffalo Sabres. Messier continued his stellar play in all areas of the ice, and was considered to be one of two favourites for the Hart Trophy along with Bruins' captain Ray Bourque.

At the 41st NHL All Star Game in Pittsburgh, three players represented the Oilers: Messier, Kevin Lowe, and Jari Kurri. Lowe was voted in as a starter by the fans, the last time to date that the Oilers had a player voted into the starting lineup via fan balloting until Connor McDavid in 2017.

As the second half of the season got underway, the Oilers entered a mid-season slump. The team could not piece together any sort of meaningful winning streak, and finished the third quarter of the season with a record of 7-8-5, good enough for an overall season record of 28-20-12. One notable achievement came on January 2 in a game against the St. Louis Blues, where Jari Kurri scored the 1,000th point of his career. Another notable game occurred on January 25 at home against the Kings, where the Oilers fell behind 6-3 after 40 minutes. In the 3rd period, the Oilers mounted their biggest comeback of the regular season, scoring 4 goals en route to a 7-6 victory. Messier led the way with 4 assists in a performance that completely overshadowed Wayne Gretzky.

Grant Fuhr was plagued by injury problems throughout the season and struggled to find his form, and was in net for a March 9 game against the Winnipeg Jets where the Oilers squandered a 4-0 first period lead and lost the game 7-5. Fuhr injured his shoulder shortly afterward and would miss a month with the injury. Ranford started most of the games during Fuhr's injury absences, but he too was injured by an errant stick in a game against the New Jersey Devils on February 6, forcing third string goaltender Pokey Reddick into service. The club also made use of minor league goalies Randy Exelby and Mike Greenlay at this time. On February 25, the Oilers lost to their provincial rivals, the Flames, by a lopsided score of 10-4. The loss put the Oilers in an unfriendly mood, and during their next game in Los Angeles on February 28, the teams combined for a then-NHL record 86 penalties, mostly in fighting majors, in a 4-2 Edmonton loss. Incidents in the game drew the ire of commentators, and even earned negative commentary from the NHL's head office. In the second last game of the season against Calgary, Grant Fuhr re-injured his bad shoulder and would have to sit out for the entire playoffs. The team finished the last quarter of the season with a 10-8-2 record: the Oilers finished the season with a record of 38-28-14, good for 2nd place in the Smythe Division and 5th place overall in the NHL. Owing to the team's fierceness at varying points in the season, culminating with the brawl in Los Angeles, the Oilers were the most penalized team in the NHL for the first time in team history.

Mark Messier finished second in the NHL scoring race; he finished with a career high 129 points (45 goals, 84 assists), 13 points behind Wayne Gretzky, 2 ahead of Steve Yzerman, and 6 ahead of Mario Lemieux (who missed 21 games with back injuries). Messier was the lone Oiler to break the 100-point barrier.  Jari Kurri recorded 93 points (33 goals, 60 assists); it was Kurri's lowest point total in 8 seasons, but in keeping with the Oilers' new two way philosophy under coach John Muckler, Kurri finished with a +18, second highest among Oiler forwards.  Craig Simpson provided some scoring, getting 29 goals and 61 points, and provided some toughness, leading the club with 180 penalty minutes. Veteran defenceman Randy Gregg led the team in plus-minus with a +24. In goal, Bill Ranford got the majority of starts, winning a club-high 24 games and having a 3.19 GAA. Grant Fuhr put together a 9–7–3 record with a 3.83 GAA despite being injured throughout the season.

For the seventh time in eight seasons, the Oilers led the league in most short-handed goals scored, with 22. They were also the most penalized team in the league, being short-handed 417 times.

Playoffs

In the opening round of the playoffs, the Oilers faced the 3rd place Winnipeg Jets for the sixth time in club history; the Oilers had won all previous five series played against the Jets, and had only lost one game in the five series combined. However, the Jets stunned Edmonton by winning the first game 7-5 at Northlands Coliseum, and took a commanding 3-1 series lead with two thrilling one-goal victories on home ice, which included game four going into double overtime. This started speculation that the Oilers could not win without Wayne Gretzky. In Game Five in Edmonton, the Jets built up a 3-1 lead in the second period, and the Oilers' season appeared to be over. However, late in the second period, the Jets had back-to-back breakaways on the same shift, and goalie Bill Ranford stopped them both. After the second breakaway the Oilers immediately transitioned to offence, and Craig Simpson scored to make it 3-2. Seconds later, the Oilers scored again to tie the game 3-3 heading to intermission. Messier scored the winner in the third period for a 4-3 Edmonton win. In Game Six in Winnipeg, The Oilers pulled out another 4-3 victory to tie the series. Kurri scored the winner on a slapshot from the right faceoff circle late in the third period. Edmonton won Game Seven on home ice 4-1, completing the comeback and moving on to the Smythe Division Finals.

In the Smythe Division Finals, the Oilers faced the Los Angeles Kings, the team that eliminated the Oilers from the playoffs the previous season. In Game One, the Oilers served notice that this time would be different, dominating from start to finish and cruising to an easy 7-0 victory. It was Bill Ranford's first career playoff shutout. Game Two was much closer for the first 45 minutes, as the Oilers held a slim 2-1 lead before scoring 4 goals in the final 6 minutes en route to an easy 6-1 victory. Game Three in Los Angeles saw the Kings jump out to a 3-1 first period lead before the Oilers scored 4 unanswered goals en route to a 5-4 win. Game Four was another high-scoring battle as the teams traded goals throughout regulation, and the game was tied 5-5 at the end of three periods. Joe Murphy scored in the first overtime to clinch the sweep for Edmonton. The Oilers got their revenge for the previous season's playoff loss, sweeping the Kings 4-0 and outscoring them 24-10. Oilers forward Esa Tikkanen almost totally neutralized Wayne Gretzky throughout the series with relentless checking and sound positional play, holding Gretzky to a single point in the entire series.

In the Campbell Conference Finals, the Oilers met the Norris Division champion Chicago Blackhawks. The Oilers would take Game One of the series, stretching their playoff win streak to eight games, before Chicago even the series at Northlands Coliseum with a 4-3 victory. Game Three at Chicago Stadium was dominated by the Blackhawks 5-1, as they took advantage of several Oiler defensive zone turnovers. In Game Four at Chicago Stadium, Mark Messier ran roughshod over the Blackhawks in what New York Times reporter Jeff Klein called "the most terrifying one-man wrecking crew display in hockey history." Messier scored two goals, added two assists, threw several hard hits, and broke multiple hockey sticks over Blackhawks' players in a 4-2 Edmonton victory. The Oilers returned home and won Game Five by a tight 4-3 margin, and returned to Chicago Stadium and thumped the Blackhawks 8-4 to clinch the series in 6 games. Forward Glenn Anderson led the way in the final game, scoring a goal and two assists. The Oilers advanced to the Stanley Cup Finals for the sixth time in eight seasons, and in their 11-year NHL history.

The team the Oilers would face for the Stanley Cup was the Presidents' Trophy champions, the Boston Bruins, whom the Oilers swept to win the 1988 Stanley Cup.  Game One, played at the Boston Garden, saw the Oilers jump to a 2-0 lead early in the second period on goals from Adam Graves and Glenn Anderson, before the Bruins tied the game in the third on two goals from Ray Bourque. The game went into overtime, and was won by the Oilers in the third overtime period on a goal from Petr Klima. The Oilers pulled off a stunning victory despite being outshot in the game 52-31. It was the longest Stanley Cup Finals game in NHL history at 115:13, a record that still stands. In Game Two, Bill Ranford kept up his great play, and the Oilers led 2-1 at the end of the first period despite being outshot 10-2. The Oilers cruised to a 7-2 victory on Boston ice behind a 3-goal, 2 assist performance from Jari Kurri. With his third goal, Kurri surpassed Wayne Gretzky as the NHL's all-time leading playoff goal scorer. The Oilers returned home for Game Three with a comfortable 2-0 series lead, but on home ice, surrendered two quick goals to the Bruins, who never looked back in cruising to a 2-1 victory. Game Four saw the Oilers jump on the Bruins early and often: Esa Tikkanen and Steve Smith shut down Bruin forwards Craig Janney and Cam Neely respectively, and the Oilers cruised to a 5-1 win. The Oilers' top line of Simpson, Messier and Anderson combined for 4 goals and 11 points. Anderson also made a major impact in Game Five in Boston: after a fast and furious first period, where both teams failed to score, Anderson scored on an end-to-end rush early in the second by walking right through two Boston defenders. Later in the period, Anderson struck again, setting up Simpson for the eventual game-winner with a spinning behind-the-back backhand pass. The Oilers would score twice more in the third and cruise to an easy 4-1 victory to claim the team's fifth Stanley Cup in seven years. Mark Messier, Glenn Anderson, Jari Kurri, Grant Fuhr, Randy Gregg, Charlie Huddy, and Kevin Lowe each won their 5th Stanley Cup with Edmonton. Goaltender Bill Ranford, a former Bruin, won the Conn Smythe Trophy after he tied an NHL record by winning all 16 playoff games. Ranford was especially spectacular in the Cup Finals, posting a 1.35 GAA and .949 save percentage against his former team. Craig Simpson led all playoff goal scorers with 16: Simpson tied with Mark Messier for the scoring lead in the playoffs with 31 points each.

Post-season

At the NHL Awards, Mark Messier was voted the winner of the Lester B. Pearson Trophy as the NHLPA's most outstanding player, and the winner of the Hart Trophy as the NHL's most valuable player. Messier was also voted to the NHL's First All-Star Team at centre. Assistant captain Kevin Lowe was voted the winner of the King Clancy Memorial Trophy for his humanitarian contributions to the community.

Season standings

Schedule and results

Playoffs

Season stats

Scoring leaders

Goaltending

Playoff stats

Scoring leaders

Goaltending

Awards and records

Awards

Milestones

Transactions

Trades

Free agents

Draft picks
Edmonton's draft picks at the 1989 NHL Entry Draft

References

 SHRP Sports
 The Internet Hockey Database
 National Hockey League Guide & Record Book 2007

Edmonton Oilers season, 1989-90
Edmon
Edmonton Oilers seasons
Stanley Cup championship seasons
Western Conference (NHL) championship seasons
Edm